Sylvia Alderyn Brownrigg (born December 16, 1964) is an American author. She is the author of seven books of fiction. Brownrigg's books have been on The New York Times notable fiction lists and Los Angeles Times and Kirkus books of the year. Her children's book, Kepler's Dream, published under the name Juliet Bell, was turned into an independent film in 2017. She won a Lambda Literary Award in 2002 for Pages for You and published the sequel to that book in 2017. Brownrigg's  reviews and criticism have appeared in a wide range of publications, including The New York Times Book Review, The Times Literary Supplement, The Guardian, New Statesman, Los Angeles Times, and The Believer.

Life

Brownrigg was born in Mountain View, California. She grew up in Los Altos, California, and Oxford, England. After graduating magna cum laude at Yale University, Brownrigg earned a Master of Arts degree in writing from Johns Hopkins University. From 1993 until 2000, she lived in London.

Brownrigg is separated from radio show host Sedge Thomson, and now lives in Berkeley, California, with their son and daughter.

Bibliography

References

External links
Sylvia Brownrigg (official website)

1964 births
20th-century American novelists
American women novelists
Living people
Writers from the San Francisco Bay Area
21st-century American novelists
Lambda Literary Award winners
20th-century American women writers
21st-century American women writers